"Underneath It All" is a song by American ska band No Doubt from their fourth studio album Rock Steady (2001). It was written by the band's lead singer Gwen Stefani and David Stewart. The song features a reggae production from Sly and Robbie and guest vocals from Lady Saw. The song received mixed reviews from contemporary music critics.

"Underneath It All" was released as the album's third single in July 2002. It became No Doubt's highest-charting US single, but was less successful elsewhere. The song won a Grammy Award for Best Pop Performance by a Duo or Group with Vocal at the 46th Grammy Awards. The song was featured in the 2004 film 50 First Dates.

Background and writing
The song was originally written by Gwen Stefani and David Stewart during Stefani's visit to boyfriend Gavin Rossdale in London. The two used backward string samples to write the song in only ten minutes. The song describes Stefani's relationship with Rossdale, and the line "You're really lovely underneath it all" comes from a journal entry that Stefani made after spending a day in the park with Rossdale. The band's guitarist Tom Dumont commented that Stewart's experience helped them keep the song simple because he "would have way overthought those chord changes." When the band was working on the album in Jamaica, producers Sly and Robbie called Lady Saw to have her contribute a guest toast. After listening to the song, Lady Saw wrote and recorded her part on the spot.

Music and structure
The song is a love song composed in the key of E major. It is written in common time and moves slowly at 69 beats per minute. Stefani avoids the heavy vocal vibrato that she often uses. Her vocal range spans under an octave and a half during the song, from F#3 to B4.

The song opens with a line sampled from Bob Clarke's Sunday radio show on IRIE FM. The verses use a simple I-vi chord progression, alternating between a first inversion E major chord and a second inversion C# minor chord, played on the off-beats and switch to a IV-iii progression. Each verse is followed by the chorus, which uses a I-IV-V-IV progression. After the bridge, Lady Saw performs her toast. Stefani then sings the chorus twice, and Clarke closes the song after Stefani repeats the line "Mm mm mm underneath it all" four times.

Critical reception
"Underneath It All" received mixed reviews from contemporary music critics. Rolling Stone found its ska sound and Stefani's questioning whether or not Rossdale is her soulmate tired. LAUNCHcast agreed the beat was one "that Sly & Robbie can do in their sleep" but added that the song "keeps its modern edge thanks to Lady Saw's cooling rap." Kitty Empire writing in NME also gave Lady Saw's toast a positive review, stating that it "does an excellent job of sexing up all the sugar." Stylus Magazine was pleased with Stefani's performance on the song, stating that "she lets her voice ride gently on top of the melody, pushed along by the gentle steel drums in the background." PopMatters commented that "No Doubt isn't afraid of working with new ideas" but that the dancehall of "Underneath It All" was unsuccessful and sloppy. In its review of The Singles 1992-2003, OMH Media described the song as "an embarrassingly self-conscious reggae pastiche, unimproved by a guest rap from Jamaican dancehall queen Lady Saw."

On their end-of-year list, The Village Voice named the song as one of the Singles of the Year for 2002.

Chart performance
"Underneath It All" peaked at number three on the Billboard Hot 100 for two weeks, becoming No Doubt's highest charting US single; "Don't Speak" had not been allowed onto the Hot 100 as it did not have a commercial single release. It was successful in mainstream music, topping the Top 40 Mainstream and reaching number two on the Top 40 Tracks. The single was also successful in the adult contemporary radio market, reaching number two on the Adult Top 40 chart with a 2004 re-appearance atop the Top 40 Adult Recurrents and peaking at number 27 on the Adult Contemporary chart. It had some crossover success on urban contemporary and Hispanic rhythmic stations, reaching the top 40 on the Latin Pop Airplay and Rhythmic Top 40 charts, and number 23 on the Latin Tropical/Salsa Airplay. The single fared poorer on the Canadian Singles Chart, where it peaked at number 35.

"Underneath It All" debuted at number 18 on the UK Singles chart but was unable to reach a higher position. It was unsuccessful across Europe, only reaching the top 40 in Austria and Sweden. On the ARIA Charts, the single peaked at number 28 and remained on the chart for seven weeks. In New Zealand, the single peaked at number eight for two consecutive weeks and stayed on the chart for over four months.

Music video

The accompanying music video for the song was directed by Sophie Muller and directing collaborative Logan. It opens with a sequence of Stefani, as shown on the cover of the single, removing several pieces of clothing and later lying on a bed. After a scene with her in front of a white heart with roses, bassist Tony Kanal and drummer Adrian Young play basketball while Stefani stands against the wall. Stefani is then shown against a sparkling sky, followed by a scene of the whole band bicycling during Lady Saw's toast. The video closes with a scene of Stefani jumping on a bed in white undergarments and without makeup.

Muller wanted to add more sexual themes to the look of the video to contrast with the innocence of the song's lyrics. The original idea for the video was to show Stefani with heavy makeup "really over done like a stripper" and have her remove her clothing throughout the video. Muller found that this complicated the video too much, so each sequence shows Stefani with progressively less makeup instead. Muller decided to use a color scheme with bright colors such as orange, lime green and pink, and the contrast was increased using Symphony in post-production. The bicycling scene was to originally show footage that the band shot while recording in Jamaica since Stefani wanted to include a Jamaican theme. Instead, the scene was created by filming the individual band members on a twelve-foot turntable in front of a bluescreen. Tracks were used to shoot two members riding next to each other and Logan used computer-generated imagery to show the entire band bicycling in Jamaica.

The video was successful on video channels. It debuted on MTV's Total Request Live October 7, 2002, at number seven. It reached number five on the countdown and was on the program for twenty-four days. "Underneath It All" peaked at number two on MuchMusic's Countdown in September 2002. The video received nominations for Best Pop Video and Best Cinematography at the 2003 MTV Video Music Awards, but lost to Justin Timberlake's "Cry Me a River" and Johnny Cash's cover of "Hurt" respectively.

Track listing and formats

Maxi single
 "Underneath It All" featuring Lady Saw (Album Version) – 5:03
 "Underneath It All" (Radio 1Live Acoustic Version) – 3:44
 "Just a Girl" (Radio 1Live Acoustic Version) – 3:30
 "Underneath It All" Video – 5:03

2-track single
 "Underneath It All" featuring Lady Saw (Album Version) – 5:03
 "Underneath It All" (Radio 1Live Acoustic Version) – 3:44

Personnel
Gwen Stefani - vocals
Tom Dumont - guitar, keyboards
Tony Kanal - bass, keyboards, saxophone
Adrian Young - drums, percussion
Gabrial McNair - trombone
Lady Saw - vocals
Ned Douglas - programming
Robbie Shakespeare - additional melodic bass
Andy Potts - saxophone
Django Stewart - saxophone

Cover versions 
 American rock band Zebrahead covered the song and released it as a single for their cover album Panty Raid.
 On November 25, 2013, Tessanne Chin covered the song on Season 5 of NBC's singing competition, The Voice for the Live Top 8 round. She also deejayed Lady Saw's verse.

Charts

Weekly charts

Year-end charts

Certifications

Release history

References

External links
 No Doubt's official website
 Lady Saw's official website
 

2000s ballads
2001 songs
2002 singles
2003 singles
Lady Saw songs
Music videos directed by Sophie Muller
No Doubt songs
Pop ballads
Reggae fusion songs
Song recordings produced by Sly & Robbie
Songs written by David A. Stewart
Songs written by Gwen Stefani